In human anatomy, the cerebral veins are blood vessels in the cerebral circulation which drain blood from the cerebrum of the human brain. They are divisible into external (superficial cerebral veins) and internal (internal cerebral veins) groups according to the outer or inner parts of the hemispheres they drain into.

External veins
The external cerebral veins known as the superficial cerebral veins are the superior cerebral veins, inferior cerebral veins, and middle cerebral veins. The superior cerebral veins on the upper side surfaces of the hemispheres drain into the superior sagittal sinus.
The superior cerebral veins include the superior anastomotic vein.

Internal veins
The internal cerebral veins are also known as the deep cerebral veins and drain the deep internal parts of the hemispheres.

References

External links
 "Model of the Human Cerebral Veins", at anatomie.uni-tuebingen.de

Veins of the head and neck